Picture Perfect may refer to:

Film and television 
 Picture Perfect (1995 film), a comedy starring Dave Thomas and Mary Page Keller
 Picture Perfect (1997 film), a romantic comedy starring Jennifer Aniston and Jay Mohr
 Picture Perfect (2016 film), a Nigerian romantic drama film
 "Picture Perfect!" (The Raccoons), an episode of The Raccoons

Literature 
 Picture Perfect (novel), a 1995 novel by Jodi Picoult
 Picture Perfect, a novel based on the TV series Charmed

Music

Albums
 Picture Perfect (12 Stones album), 2017
 Picture Perfect (Every Avenue album), 2009
 Picture Perfect (Soil album), 2009
 Picture Perfect, by Ahmad Jamal, 2001
 Picture Perfect, by Close to Home, 2006
 Picture Perfect, by Rittz, 2020

Songs
 "Picture Perfect" (Roll Deep song), 2012
 "Picture Perfect" (Sevendust song), 2013
 "Picture Perfect", by Angela Via released before her song "I Don't Care"
 "Picture Perfect", by Chamillionaire from The Sound of Revenge
 "Picture Perfect", by Chris Brown from Exclusive
 "Picture Perfect!", by Jeffree Star from Cupcakes Taste Like Violence
 "Picture Perfect", by Man Overboard from Man Overboard
 "Picture Perfect", by Michael W. Smith from Change Your World
 "Picture Perfect", by Nelly Furtado from Folklore
 "Picture Perfect", by Wizkid from Sounds from the Other Side
 "Picture Perfect (Freestyle)", by Jhené Aiko from Trip